Florian Clara (born 11 February 1988) is an Italian luger who has competed since 2005. A natural track luger, he won five medals at the FIL World Luge Natural Track Championships with three golds (Men's doubles: 2009, Mixed team: 2009, 2011) and two silvers (Men's doubles: 2011, Mixed team: 2007).

Biography
Clara also won three medals at the FIL European Luge Natural Track Championships with a gold (men's doubles: 2010) and two silvers (men's doubles: 2008, mixed team: 2010).

References
FIL-Luge profile
Natural track World Championships results: 1979-2007

External links 

 

1988 births
Living people
Italian male lugers
Italian lugers
People from San Martin de Tor
Sportspeople from Südtirol